Hart House is a historic home located at York, York County, South Carolina. It was built about 1855, and is a frame Greek Revival style raised cottage on a brick foundation. It features Palladian windows in the gable ends and a double portico with simple square columns.

It was added to the National Register of Historic Places in 1977.

References

Houses on the National Register of Historic Places in South Carolina
Greek Revival houses in South Carolina
Houses completed in 1855
Houses in York County, South Carolina
National Register of Historic Places in York County, South Carolina